The 1979 Queen's Club Championships  (known for sponsorship as the Stella Artois Championships) was a men's tennis tournament played on outdoor grass courts at the Queen's Club in London in the United Kingdom that was part of the 1979 Colgate-Palmolive Grand Prix circuit. It was the 77th edition of the tournament and was held from 11 June through 17 June 1979.

Tony Roche was the defending champion but did not compete that year. Second-seeded John McEnroe won the singles title,  defeating Víctor Pecci in the final 6–7, 6–1, 6–1.

Seeds

  Jimmy Connors (withdrew)
  John McEnroe (champion)
  Vitas Gerulaitis (first round)
  Roscoe Tanner (semifinals)
  Arthur Ashe (semifinals)
  Brian Gottfried (third round)
  José Luis Clerc (second round)
  John Alexander (second round)
  Tim Gullikson (first round)
  Peter Fleming (first round)
  Sandy Mayer (quarterfinals)
  Dick Stockton (quarterfinals)
  Johan Kriek (first round)
  Vijay Amritraj (third round)
  Víctor Pecci (final)
  Stan Smith (second round)

Draw

Finals

Top half

Section 1

Section 2

Bottom half

Section 3

Section 4

References

External links
Official website Queen's Club Championships 
ATP tournament profile

Singles